This is a list of wars involving the Republic of Sudan.

Mahdist Sudan (1885–1899)

Post-independence (from 1956)

See also
 East African Campaign (World War II)

Bibliography
First Sudanese Civil War:
 Assefa, Hizkias. 1987. Mediation of Civil Wars, Approaches and Strategies – The Sudan Conflict. Boulder, Colorado: Westview Press.
 Eprile, Cecil.  War and Peace in the Sudan, 1955 – 1972.  David and Charles, London. 1974.  .
 Johnson, Douglas H. 1979. "Book Review: The Secret War in the Sudan: 1955–1972 by Edgar O'Ballance". African Affairs 78 (310):132–7.
 O'Ballance, Edgar. 1977. The Secret War in the Sudan: 1955–1972. Hamden, Connecticut: Archon Books. (Faber and Faber edition ).
 Poggo, Scopas Sekwat. 1999. War and Conflict in Southern Sudan, 1955–1972. PhD Dissertation, University of California, Santa Barbara.

References

External links
Second Sudanese Civil War:
 Background Q & A: The Darfur Crisis, Esther Pan, Council on Foreign Relations, cfr.org
 Price of Peace in Africa: Agreement in Sudan Between Government and Rebel
 Photojournalist's Account – Displacement of Sudan's second civil war
 In pictures: Sudan trek – of returning refugees after the war, BBC, 14 June 2005
 With Peace, Sudan Faces Hard Choices, Washington Post, 28 July 2005
 The Nuba Mountains Homepage
 Bishop calls for Churchwide day of prayer and fasting for an end to Sudan violence on 26 June 2011 – leading up to the 9 July expected day of new independence for the Southern Sudan.
War in Darfur:
 Sudan: Passion of the Present, includes list of web news and resources
 Rashdan, Abdelrahman, FAQs on DarfurIslamOnline.net. Retrieved 2007-09-13.
 Darfur Report
 Analyzing Darfur's Conflict of Definitions: Interview with Prof. Mahmood Mamdani. Retrieved 2009-03-19.
 "Khartoum bashing": an article in the TLS by Justin Willis, 7 November 2003
 Rule of Law in Armed Conflict – Sudan
 Insight on Conflict, SIRC
 The Small Arms Survey – Sudan
 Photojournalist's Account – Displacement caused by the genocide in Darfur
 ODI HPG Policy Brief: Humanitarian Advocacy in Darfur: the challenge of neutrality
 Darfur Story: an article in Islam Story by Dr Ragheb Elsergany, 16 March 2009
 Genocide – A Penn State Conversation about Darfur
 "On our Watch": PBS Frontline documentary
 Darfuri Children's Drawings at the University of South Florida
 Crisis in Darfur, Sudan, Web Archive, 2006 from the U.S. Library of Congress

 
Sudan